The Aracacá or Aracaçá River is a river of Roraima state in northern Brazil.

See also
List of rivers of Roraima

References

Brazilian Ministry of Transport

Rivers of Roraima